The Friends of Wales Caucus is a congressional caucus consisting of Welsh and Welsh heritage congresspeople in the United States Government, Senate and House of Representatives.

The group was founded by Rep. Morgan Griffith of Virginia and joined by lawmakers who wanted to "build direct relations with Wales" in light of the 250 American-owned companies based in Wales, and the close Welsh heritage in regions of the US such as in Utah, Idaho, Vermont, Oregon, Wyoming, as well as shared industrial heritage between Wales and Pennsylvania and Ohio. It was established in partnership with the Welsh Government.

History 
The group was established in 2014 by Virginia Representative Morgan Griffith. He reportedly instigated the concept when he was invited to join the Friends of Scotland Caucus, and enquired "What about the Welsh?" Griffith appropriately represents a coal community, many of which in the United States were historically populated by emigrating Welsh miners who sought work across the Atlantic.

In his statement, he said he was both "proud of my own Welsh heritage, as well as the connections between my district in Southwest Virginia and Wales."

In recent years the group have worked with the Global Welsh international diaspora group, which serves as the grassroots diaspora organisation for Welsh heritage people worldwide, and who have significant branches in Chicago, Virginia, and New York City, acting as a business networking community as well as a cultural exchange.

In 2014 Welsh First Minister Carwyn Jones completed an official five day visit on St. David's Day to Washington, D.C. and New York, meeting with the Caucus, holding a British Council-sponsored opening of a Dylan Thomas event in Greenwich Village, and taking part in engagements at the New York Stock Exchange.

Jones again undertook official engagements in Washington DC, Philadelphia and New York on St David's Day, again meeting with the Caucus for the occasion.

In 2015 the group sent a group of five Congresspeople to Swansea University's new Bay Campus for the first ever US Congressional delegation to Wales. The visitors included Morgan Griffith (R-VA), Kenny Marchant (R-TX), Dan Kildee (D-MI) and Matt Cartwright (D-PA). The visit focussed on establishing higher education links such as the link between Swansea University's College of Engineering and the Virginia Tech College of Engineering, as well as the university's American Studies course.

Aims 
The organization says it will hold regular social and educational events to inform Members of Congress about Welsh culture, heritage, as well as trade, tourism, investment, and economic opportunities. Businesses particularly engaged with the group's events typically include those in the aerospace, cybersecurity, engineering and automotive sectors.

Annual events 
It holds an annual celebration for Saint David's Day, a yearly cultural event in Wales celebrating the Patron of Wales Saint David. The event is attended by the British Ambassador (for its 2014 inauguration this was Ambassador Peter Westmacott) and hosts U.S. lawmakers, representatives of the British and Welsh governments, and business leaders. It has also been recently attended by recent Welsh First Ministers, Carwyn Jones and Mark Drakeford. The event draws on Welsh cultural staples such as fish and chips, Welsh whisky, and traditional Welsh music including choirs and harpists. Similar engagements are held by the College of William & Mary, who have a Williamsburg chapter of the Friends of Wales and whose Swem Library features an extensive collection of Welsh poetry established in 1969.

Membership 
Membership is not limited to those of Welsh heritage, and includes those in Congress interested in the country more broadly. The organisation is supported by the Welsh Government trade mission in Washington and North America broadly, as well as the British Embassy Washington.

See also 

 List of Welsh Americans
 Welsh Americans
 Welsh Tract
 Americans in the United Kingdom
 Welsh settlement in the Americas
 Wales and the United States
 Welsh Centre for International Affairs
 Politics of Wales
 Friends of Ireland
 U.K. Caucus
 Friends of Scotland Caucus

References

External links 

 Letter of establishment by Morgan Griffith
 Trade and Invest Wales a branch of the Welsh Government
 North America Wales Foundation a charity set up to promote education and cultural links
 North American Festival of Wales an annual event
 Wales in North America on Twitter

Political organizations based in the United States
Caucuses of the United States Congress
2014 in American politics
2014 establishments in Washington, D.C.
Welsh American
Welsh-American history
American people of Welsh descent
Welsh-American culture in Virginia
United States friendship associations